Samkutty Pattomkary  (born 17 April 1969) is an Indian theatre director, playwright, scenic and light designer, screenwriter, and poet from Kallara, Kottayam District, India. He done more than 75 productions in Malayalam, English, Hindi and Kannada. He was a former Council Member of the Kerala Sangeeta Nataka Academy. He completed his NDFA in painting from RLV College of Music and Fine Arts, Thrippunithura, Kerala. Bachelor and Master in Theatre Arts from School Of Drama & Fine Arts, Thrissur, Kerala. He holds a Ph.D. in theatre arts from Jawaharlal Nehru University. He was formerly an Executive Member of the Kerala Sangeetha Nataka Akademi. In 2018 he received a State Award for his play Lalla by Kerala Sahitya Akademi, Government of Kerala. He is now settled in Thrissur.

Awards and recognition 
2022 Prof. Perunna Vijayan Nataka Award 
2018 O Madhavan Award for his entire body of work in theatre
2017 Pravasi Kerala Sangeeth Nataka Akademy Award
2016 State Award for Scenic designer (Mayadarpan), Kerala Sangeetha Nataka Akademi, Government of Kerala
2016 State Award for Playwright (Lalla), Kerala Sahitya Akademy Award, Government of Kerala

References

External links

https://stagebuzz.in/2020/02/17/samkutty-pattomkarys-play-adayalam/
https://www.cinemaexpress.com/stories/news/2019/jun/03/syam-pushkaran-aashiq-abu-project-in-the-works-12019.html
https://www.deshabhimani.com/art-stage/p-m-taj-remembered/955134
https://www.livemint.com/Leisure/ZzkS8xw8yBGc5o2lZkuRAM/Conversation--I-wish-I-were-a-magician.html
https://www.marunadanmalayalee.com/ireland/association/drama-workshop-138038
https://www.asianetnews.com/pravasam/first-international-drama-award-of-bahrain-prathibha-awarded-by-minister-saji-cheriyan-r62koh
http://m4malayalam.tv/news-165/
http://www.whykol.com/movies/man-kolangal-3305/

Malayalam-language dramatists and playwrights
Malayalam screenwriters
Writers from Kottayam
Recipients of the Kerala Sahitya Akademi Award
Indian theatre directors
Jawaharlal Nehru University alumni
Living people
1969 births